Graham Harvey is an Australian actor, best known for his roles in television soap operas.

Prominent roles 
His credits include: The Sullivans (as Robbie McGovern), The Young Doctors (as Dr. David Henderson), Return to Eden (as Chris Harper), E Street (as Michael Sturgess) and Neighbours (as Rob Evans).

External links
 

Australian male television actors
Living people
Year of birth missing (living people)